Ouvrage Baisse de Saint Véran is a lesser work (petit ouvrage) of the Maginot Line's Alpine extension, the Alpine Line.  The ouvrage consists of one infantry block facing Italy. Three combat blocks and an entrance block were planned, but only Block 2 was built, with one observation/light machine gun cloche, three light machine gun embrasures and one heavy twin machine gun embrasure at an altitude of 1915 meters.  However, armament was never furnished and the cloche was not fitted. Almost none of the supporting subterranean galleries were completed. The position was manned in 1940 by 68 soldiers of the 40th Demi-Brigade des Fusiliers Alpins under Sub-Lieutenant Kessler.

See also 
 List of Alpine Line ouvrages

References

Bibliography 
Allcorn, William. The Maginot Line 1928-45. Oxford: Osprey Publishing, 2003. 
Kaufmann, J.E. and Kaufmann, H.W. Fortress France: The Maginot Line and French Defenses in World War II, Stackpole Books, 2006. 
Kaufmann, J.E., Kaufmann, H.W., Jancovič-Potočnik, A. and Lang, P. The Maginot Line: History and Guide, Pen and Sword, 2011. 
Mary, Jean-Yves; Hohnadel, Alain; Sicard, Jacques. Hommes et Ouvrages de la Ligne Maginot, Tome 1. Paris, Histoire & Collections, 2001.  
Mary, Jean-Yves; Hohnadel, Alain; Sicard, Jacques. Hommes et Ouvrages de la Ligne Maginot, Tome 4 - La fortification alpine. Paris, Histoire & Collections, 2009.  
Mary, Jean-Yves; Hohnadel, Alain; Sicard, Jacques. Hommes et Ouvrages de la Ligne Maginot, Tome 5. Paris, Histoire & Collections, 2009.

External links 
 Saint Véran (petit ouvrage de la Baisse de) at fortiff.be 
 Info, location and photos about the  PO de Saint Véran  at wikimaginot.eu 
 

BAIS
Maginot Line
Alpine Line